Gauss Glacier is a steep glacier on the north side of Datum Peak, descending west from the southwestern extremity of Hobbs Ridge into Blue Glacier, in Victoria Land, Antarctica. It was named by the New Zealand Geographic Board in 1993 after the German mathematician and astronomer Carl Friedrich Gauss.

References

Glaciers of Victoria Land
Scott Coast